Streptomyces sindenensis is a bacterium species from the genus of Streptomyces which has been isolated from soil in Japan. Streptomyces sindenensis produces actinomycin-D and the amicetin complex

See also 
 List of Streptomyces species

References

Further reading

External links
Type strain of Streptomyces sindenensis at BacDive -  the Bacterial Diversity Metadatabase

sindenensis
Bacteria described in 1957